Igor Sergeyevich Son (born 16 November 1998) is a Kazakhstani weightlifter.

In 2017, he competed in the men's 56 kg event at the Asian Indoor and Martial Arts Games held in Ashgabat, Turkmenistan. In 2018, he won the silver medal in the men's 61 kg event at the 5th International Qatar Cup held in Doha, Qatar.

2019 World Weightlifting
He won the silver medal in the men's 55 kg event at the 2019 World Weightlifting Championships held in Pattaya, Thailand. In that same year, he also won the gold medal in the men's 61kg event at the 6th International Qatar Cup held in Doha, Qatar.

2020 Summer Olympics
In 2021, he won the bronze medal in the men's 61 kg event at the 2020 Summer Olympics in Tokyo, Japan.

Testing
In March 2022, he tested positive for a banned substance. In Februari 2023 he got suspended for eight years. Kazakhastan has a long history of doping among its professional athletes.

References

External links
 

1998 births
Living people
Kazakhstani male weightlifters
World Weightlifting Championships medalists
Weightlifters at the 2020 Summer Olympics
Olympic weightlifters of Kazakhstan
Medalists at the 2020 Summer Olympics
Olympic bronze medalists for Kazakhstan
Olympic medalists in weightlifting
Doping cases in weightlifting
Kazakhstani sportspeople in doping cases
21st-century Kazakhstani people
Kazakhstani people of Korean descent